DNCE is an American dance-rock band consisting of lead singer Joe Jonas, drummer Jack Lawless, and guitarist JinJoo Lee. Bassist and keyboardist Cole Whittle was a part of the band from when it started in 2015 to when it went on hiatus in 2018. DNCE's music is mainly dance-rock, dance-pop, pop rock, and funk-pop. The band signed with Republic Records, who released their debut single, "Cake by the Ocean", which was released on September 18, 2015. The song reached the top 10 on several charts, including on the US Billboard Hot 100, where it peaked at number nine. Their debut extended play (EP), Swaay, was released on October 23, 2015. Their self-titled debut studio album was released on November 18, 2016. Their second EP, People to People, was released on June 15, 2018. They were also nominated for Favorite New Artist for the 2016 Kids' Choice Awards and Best Song to Lip Sync and Best Anthem for the 2016 Radio Disney Music Awards. The group performed at the 2017 Fashion Meets Music Festival. In February 2022, DNCE returned after their hiatus with a collaboration with Kygo titled "Dancing Feet".

Career

2015–2017: Commercial debut, Swaay, and DNCE
Lead singer Joe Jonas originally rose to fame as a member of the band the Jonas Brothers, alongside his brothers, Nick and Kevin. Both guitarist JinJoo Lee and drummer Jack Lawless were, for varying tenures, a part of the Jonas Brothers' live backing band, playing guitar and drums respectively. The idea for DNCE first came about while Jonas and Lawless were living together, although the project was put on hold due to the duo's respective busy schedules. Jonas, Lawless, and Lee officially came together to form DNCE in 2015. Though work on music had already begun, the group struggled to find a fourth member to fit into the band. Jonas began working with American singer-songwriter Justin Tranter for DNCE's music. This led to the friendship of Jonas and bassist and keyboardist Cole Whittle, the now-former bassist in Tranter's band, Semi Precious Weapons. Ultimately, Whittle was added as a full-time member of the band. The group named themselves DNCE, which lyrically spoke of being too drunk to spell the word "dance". Jonas later added that the group decided on the name as it described the "imperfect awesome[ness] of the four of [them] together." Lee later added that "much like the spelling of the word, you don't have to be a perfect dancer to dance in life." 

The group began performing secret shows in New York City to rehearse for their upcoming tour and promotional performances. DNCE made an official Instagram account in September 2015 and Jonas later posted a teaser video for the band on his account, tagging the band's official page, on September 10, 2015. The band released their debut single, "Cake by the Ocean", on September 18, 2015. Though starting out slow, the song managed to reach the top 10 across several charts, including a number nine peak on the Billboard Hot 100. The band released their debut extended play, Swaay, on October 23, 2015. The band embarked on a 14-date tour in November 2015, known as the Greatest Tour Ever. All 14 scheduled dates for the tour sold out. The tour received critical praise, and featured unreleased songs as well as covers of older classics. 

On January 31, 2016, DNCE made a cameo during Fox's television special Grease: Live; a live production of the Broadway musical Grease. The band performed as Johnny Casino and the Gamblers during a high school dance scene, which incorporated a 1950s-inspired rendition of "Cake by the Ocean" and a cover of the Crickets' "Maybe Baby" alongside the Grease songs "Born to Hand Jive" and "Rock & Roll Is Here to Stay". In an interview with Rolling Stone, Jonas explained that DNCE was approached by the producers of the special following a show in New York City, and that he had always been a fan of Grease. In February 2016, the band joined American singer Selena Gomez as opening acts for her Revival Tour. On February 26, 2016, DNCE was featured on American singer and actress Hailee Steinfeld's single, "Rock Bottom", from the update of her debut extended play, Haiz, which was then considered the main version of the song. On April 22, 2016, the group appeared on BBC One's The Graham Norton Show, performing "Cake by the Ocean". "Toothbrush" was chosen as the second single from Swaay, being sent to contemporary hit radio on May 17, 2016. The song peaked at number 44 on the Billboard Hot 100.

On September 14, 2016, DNCE announced their self-titled debut studio album and its release date. The album includes three songs from Swaay: "Cake by the Ocean", "Toothbrush", and "Pay My Rent", while the last song from the EP, "Jinx" only stayed on the EP. The lead single of the album, "Body Moves", was released on September 30. Three promotional singles were subsequently released for three Fridays in a row: "Blown" (featuring Kent Jones) on October 28, "Good Day" on November 4, and "Be Mean" on November 11. The album was released on November 18, the next Friday. On April 14, 2017, the band released the single "Kissing Strangers", featuring Trinidadian-American rapper Nicki Minaj. On August 25, 2017, DNCE was featured on a remade version of British singer-songwriter Rod Stewart's single, "Da Ya Think I'm Sexy?".

2018–2019: People to People and hiatus
To start out 2018, DNCE released the single, "Dance" on January 26. On April 6, they were featured on Italian record producer duo Merk & Kremont's single, "Hands Up". On June 15, they released their second extended play, People to People. In late February 2019, the Jonas Brothers announced their comeback. Jonas and Lawless resumed work with them and DNCE hiatus for more than three years. The Jonas Brothers have since incorporated "Cake By the Ocean" into their live set.

2022: Return and Whittle's departure
On February 7, 2022, DNCE announced their return, without former bandmate Cole Whittle. On February 25, 2022, DNCE was featured on Norwegian record producer and DJ Kygo's single "Dancing Feet", as their comeback single. Another single, titled "Move", was released on May 6, 2022.

Artistry
Now-former band member Cole Whittle has said, "Musically, we sound like disco funk hits played by a good garage band." The band's influences include the Electric Light Orchestra, Sly and the Family Stone, Weezer, Earth, Wind & Fire, Hall & Oates, Prince, the Bee Gees, and Led Zeppelin.

Members
Current members 
Joe Jonas: lead vocals – Jonas first rose to prominence as a member of the Jonas Brothers, a band that has considerable success across music, film and television.
Jack Lawless: drums, percussion, backing vocals – Jack Lawless played drums for the Jonas Brothers from their Marvelous Party Tour (2007) until their disbandment, and again from their 2019 reunion onwards. Lawless and Jonas were roommates, with Lawless continuing to perform with the band on subsequent tours. In 2010, Lawless became the drummer for alternative rock band Ocean Grove; the group released their debut extended play in 2011.
JinJoo Lee: guitar, backing vocals – Lee is from South Korea and, like Lawless, has previously toured with acts such as the Jonas Brothers, playing the guitar. She was a member of CeeLo Green's touring band from 2010 to 2011, and later worked with JoJo and Charli XCX.
Former members 
Cole Whittle: bass guitar, keyboards, backing vocals – Whittle rose to fame as the bassist for Semi Precious Weapons. The band released three studio albums during their run, with their final release coming in 2014. He has also recently contributed as a songwriter, alongside fellow Semi Precious Weapons member Justin Tranter. Whittle did not return to DNCE when they reunited in 2022 due to focusing on his solo career.

Discography

 DNCE (2016)

Filmography

Tours

Headlining
The Greatest Tour Ever Tour (2015-2016)
DNCE in Concert (2017)
DNCE GOGO SAIKO Japan Tour (2017)
Opening act
Revival Tour  (2016)
24K Magic World Tour  (2017-2018)

Awards and nominations

References

 
American pop music groups
Musical groups established in 2015
Musical groups disestablished in 2018
Musical groups reestablished in 2022
Musical trios
Republic Records artists
2015 establishments in California